Frank Herbert's Dune is a 2001 3D video game based on the 2000 Sci Fi Channel miniseries of the same name. The game was not a commercial or critical success, and was one of the last games by Cryo Interactive, which went bankrupt shortly after the game's failure.

Production 
By the time the game was made, Cryo had already started to be in financial debt. The game turned out to be a costly flop, and the studio was unable to find creditors to keep operations running. The PlayStation 2 version was released only in Europe.

Plot 
As Paul, the son of the Duke Atreides's concubine and heir to the throne, the player must earn the trust and respect from the natives of the desert planet Dune, the Fremen, to ultimately become their prophesied messiah and free them from the desolate conditions of the planet. He also needs to overcome the evil Baron Harkonnen who slaughtered the Atreides family with covert backup from the Emperor.

The story behind each mission is accurate to the novels, though taking place during the two-year span in the 1965 novel Dune when Paul gains the trust of the Fremen.

Critical reception 

Dune was a finalist for The Electric Playgrounds 2001 "Best Adventure Game for PC" award, but lost the prize to Myst III: Exile.

References

External links
 
 

2001 video games
Adventure games
Cryo Interactive games
DreamCatcher Interactive games
PlayStation 2 games
Video games based on Dune (franchise)
Video games developed in France
Video games set on fictional planets
Windows games
RenderWare games
Single-player video games